The 1923 Auburn Tigers football team represented Auburn University in the 1923 college football season. It was the Tigers' 32nd overall and they competed as a member of the Southern Conference (SoCon). The team was led by head coach Boozer Pitts, in his first year, and played their home games at Drake Field in Auburn, Alabama. They finished with a record of three wins, three losses and three ties (3–3–3 overall, 0–1–3 in the SoCon).

Schedule

References

Auburn
Auburn Tigers football seasons
Auburn Tigers football